William of Ockham, OFM (also Occam, from ;  1287 – 10 April 1347) was an English Franciscan friar, scholastic philosopher, apologist, and Catholic theologian, who is believed to have been born in Ockham, a small village in Surrey. He is considered to be one of the major figures of medieval thought and was at the centre of the major intellectual and political controversies of the 14th century. He is commonly known for Occam's razor, the methodological principle that bears his name, and also produced significant works on logic, physics and theology. William is remembered in the Church of England with a commemoration on 10 April.

Life
William of Ockham was born in Ockham, Surrey in 1287. He received his elementary education in the London House of the Greyfriars. It is believed that he then studied theology at the University of Oxford from 1309 to 1321, but while he completed all the requirements for a master's degree in theology, he was never made a regent master.

During the Middle Ages, theologian Peter Lombard's Sentences (1150) had become a standard work of theology, and many ambitious theological scholars wrote commentaries on it. William of Ockham was among these scholarly commentators. However, William's commentary was not well received by his colleagues, or by the Church authorities. In 1324, his commentary was condemned as unorthodox by a synod of bishops, and he was ordered to Avignon, France, to defend himself before a papal court.

An alternative understanding, recently proposed by George Knysh, suggests that he was initially appointed in Avignon as a professor of philosophy in the Franciscan school, and that his disciplinary difficulties did not begin until 1327. It is generally believed that these charges were levied by Oxford chancellor John Lutterell. The Franciscan Minister General, Michael of Cesena, had been summoned to Avignon, to answer charges of heresy. A theological commission had been asked to review his Commentary on the Sentences, and it was during this that William of Ockham found himself involved in a different debate. Michael of Cesena had asked William to review arguments surrounding Apostolic poverty. The Franciscans believed that Jesus and his apostles owned no property either individually or in common, and the Rule of Saint Francis commanded members of the order to follow this practice. This brought them into conflict with Pope John XXII.

Because of the pope's attack on the Rule of Saint Francis, William of Ockham, Michael of Cesena and other leading Franciscans fled Avignon on 26 May 1328, and eventually took refuge in the court of the Holy Roman Emperor Louis IV of Bavaria, who was also engaged in dispute with the papacy, and became William's patron. After studying the works of John XXII and previous papal statements, William agreed with the Minister General. In return for protection and patronage William wrote treatises that argued for Emperor Louis to have supreme control over church and state in the Holy Roman Empire. "On June 6, 1328, William was officially excommunicated for leaving Avignon without permission," and William argued that John XXII was a heretic for attacking the doctrine of Apostolic poverty and the Rule of Saint Francis, which had been endorsed by previous popes. William of Ockham's philosophy was never officially condemned as heretical.

He spent much of the remainder of his life writing about political issues, including the relative authority and rights of the spiritual and temporal powers. After Michael of Cesena's death in 1342, William became the leader of the small band of Franciscan dissidents living in exile with Louis IV. William of Ockham died (prior to the outbreak of the plague) on 9 April 1347.

Philosophical thought

In scholasticism, William of Ockham advocated reform in both method and content, the aim of which was simplification. William incorporated much of the work of some previous theologians, especially Duns Scotus. From Duns Scotus, William of Ockham derived his view of divine omnipotence, his view of grace and justification, much of his epistemology and ethical convictions. However, he also reacted to and against Scotus in the areas of predestination, penance, his understanding of universals, his formal distinction  (that is, "as applied to created things"), and his view of parsimony which became known as Occam's razor.

Faith and reason
William of Ockham espoused fideism, stating that "only faith gives us access to theological truths. The ways of God are not open to reason, for God has freely chosen to create a world and establish a way of salvation within it apart from any necessary laws that human logic or rationality can uncover." He believed that science was a matter of discovery and saw God as the only ontological necessity. His importance is as a theologian with a strongly developed interest in logical method, and whose approach was critical rather than system building.

Nominalism
William of Ockham was a pioneer of nominalism, and some consider him the father of modern epistemology, because of his strongly argued position that only individuals exist, rather than supra-individual universals, essences, or forms, and that universals are the products of abstraction from individuals by the human mind and have no extra-mental existence. He denied the real existence of metaphysical universals and advocated the reduction of ontology. William of Ockham is sometimes considered an advocate of conceptualism rather than nominalism, for whereas nominalists held that universals were merely names, i.e. words rather than extant realities, conceptualists held that they were mental concepts, i.e. the names were names of concepts, which do exist, although only in the mind. Therefore, the universal concept has for its object, not a reality existing in the world outside us, but an internal representation which is a product of the understanding itself and which "supposes" in the mind the things to which the mind attributes it; that is, it holds, for the time being, the place of the things which it represents. It is the term of the reflective act of the mind. Hence the universal is not a mere word, as Roscelin taught, nor a sermo, as Peter Abelard held, namely the word as used in the sentence, but the mental substitute for real things, and the term of the reflective process. For this reason William has sometimes also been called a "terminist", to distinguish him from a nominalist or a conceptualist.

Others want to distinguish Ockham as a "Terminist" to distinguish him from both Nominalism and Conceptualism.

William of Ockham was a theological voluntarist who believed that if God had wanted to, he could have become incarnate as a donkey or an ox, or even as both a donkey and a man at the same time. He was criticized for this belief by his fellow theologians and philosophers.

Efficient reasoning
One important contribution that he made to modern science and modern intellectual culture was efficient reasoning with the principle of parsimony in explanation and theory building that came to be known as Occam's razor. This maxim, as interpreted by Bertrand Russell, states that if one can explain a phenomenon without assuming this or that hypothetical entity, there is no ground for assuming it, i.e. that one should always opt for an explanation in terms of the fewest possible causes, factors, or variables. He turned this into a concern for ontological parsimony; the principle says that one should not multiply entities beyond necessity——although this well-known formulation of the principle is not to be found in any of William's extant writings. He formulates it as: "For nothing ought to be posited without a reason given, unless it is self-evident (literally, known through itself) or known by experience or proved by the authority of Sacred Scripture." For William of Ockham, the only truly necessary entity is God; everything else is contingent. He thus does not accept the principle of sufficient reason, rejects the distinction between essence and existence, and opposes the Thomistic doctrine of active and passive intellect. His scepticism to which his ontological parsimony request leads appears in his doctrine that human reason can prove neither the immortality of the soul; nor the existence, unity, and infinity of God. These truths, he teaches, are known to us by revelation alone.

Natural philosophy
William wrote a great deal on natural philosophy, including a long commentary on Aristotle's Physics. According to the principle of ontological parsimony, he holds that we do not need to allow entities in all ten of Aristotle's categories; we thus do not need the category of quantity, as the mathematical entities are not "real". Mathematics must be applied to other categories, such as the categories of substance or qualities, thus anticipating modern scientific renaissance while violating Aristotelian prohibition of metabasis.

Theory of knowledge

In the theory of knowledge, William rejected the scholastic theory of species, as unnecessary and not supported by experience, in favour of a theory of abstraction. This was an important development in late medieval epistemology. He also distinguished between intuitive and abstract cognition; intuitive cognition depends on the existence or non-existence of the object, whereas abstractive cognition "abstracts" the object from the existence predicate. Interpreters are, as yet, undecided about the roles of these two types of cognitive activities.

Political theory
William of Ockham is also increasingly being recognized as an important contributor to the development of Western constitutional ideas, especially those of government with limited responsibility. He was one of the first medieval authors to advocate a form of church/state separation, and was important for the early development of the notion of property rights. His political ideas are regarded as "natural" or "secular", holding for a secular absolutism. The views on monarchical accountability espoused in his Dialogus (written between 1332 and 1347) greatly influenced the Conciliar movement and assisted in the emergence of liberal democratic ideologies.

William argued for complete separation of spiritual rule and earthly rule. He thought that the pope and churchmen have no right or grounds at all for secular rule like having property, citing 2 Timothy 2:4. That belongs solely to earthly rulers, who may also accuse the pope of crimes, if need be.

After the Fall God had given men, including non-Christians, two powers: private ownership and the right to set their rulers, who should serve the interest of the people, not some special interests. Thus he preceded Thomas Hobbes in formulating social contract theory along with earlier scholars.

William of Ockham said that the Franciscans avoided both private and common ownership by using commodities, including food and clothes, without any rights, with mere , the ownership still belonging to the donor of the item or to the pope. Their opponents such as Pope John XXII wrote that use without any ownership cannot be justified: "It is impossible that an external deed could be just if the person has no right to do it."

Thus the disputes on the heresy of Franciscans led William of Ockham and others to formulate some fundamentals of economic theory and the theory of ownership.

Logic
In logic, William of Ockham wrote down in words the formulae that would later be called De Morgan's laws, and he pondered ternary logic, that is, a logical system with three truth values; a concept that would be taken up again in the mathematical logic of the 19th and 20th centuries. His contributions to semantics, especially to the maturing theory of supposition, are still studied by logicians. William of Ockham was probably the first logician to treat empty terms in Aristotelian syllogistic effectively; he devised an empty term semantics that exactly fit the syllogistic. Specifically, an argument is valid according to William's semantics if and only if it is valid according to Prior Analytics.

Theological thought

Church authority 
William of Ockham denied papal infallibility and often went into conflict with the pope. However despite his conflicts with the papacy he did not renounce the Roman Catholic Church. Ockham also held that councils of the Church were fallible, he held that any individual could err on matters of faith, and councils being composed of multiple fallible individuals could err. He thus foreshadowed some elements of Luther's view of sola scriptura.

Church and State 
Ockham taught the separation of church and state, believing that the pope and emperor should be separate.

Apostolic poverty 
Ockham advocated for voluntary poverty.

Soul 
Ockham proposed that the souls of the Christians did not instantly get to enjoy the vision of God but would only when they have been rejoined with the body at the last judgement.

Literary Ockhamism/nominalism
William of Ockham and his works have been discussed as a possible influence on several late medieval literary figures and works, especially Geoffrey Chaucer, but also Jean Molinet, the Gawain poet, François Rabelais, John Skelton, Julian of Norwich, the York and Townely Plays, and Renaissance romances. Only in very few of these cases is it possible to demonstrate direct links to William of Ockham or his texts. Correspondences between Ockhamist and Nominalist philosophy/theology and literary texts from medieval to postmodern times have been discussed within the scholarly paradigm of literary nominalism. Erasmus, in his Praise of Folly, criticized him together with Duns Scotus as fuelling unnecessary controversies inside the Church.

Works

The standard edition of the philosophical and theological works is: William of Ockham: , Gedeon Gál, et al., eds. 17 vols. St. Bonaventure, New York: The Franciscan Institute, 1967–1988.

The seventh volume of the  contains the doubtful and spurious works.

, 4 vols., 1940–1997, Manchester: Manchester University Press [vols. 1–3]; Oxford: Oxford University Press [vol. 4].

Abbreviations: OT =  vol. 1–10; OP =  vol. 1–7.

Philosophical writings
  (Sum of Logic) (c. 1323, OP 1).
 , 1321–1324, OP 2).
 , 1321–1324, OP 2).
 , 1321–1324, OP 2).
 , 1321–1324, OP 2).
  (Treatise on Predestination and God's Foreknowledge with respect to Future Contingents, 1322–1324, OP 2).
  (Exposition of Aristotle's Sophistic refutations, 1322–1324, OP 3).
  (Exposition of Aristotle's Physics) (1322–1324, OP 4).
  (Exposition of Aristotle's Physics) (1322–1324, OP 5).
  (Brief Summa of the Physics, 1322–23, OP 6).
  (Little Summa of Natural Philosophy, 1319–1321, OP 6).
  (Questions on Aristotle's Books of the Physics, before 1324, OP 6).

Theological writings
  (Commentary on the Sentences of Peter Lombard).
 Book I completed shortly after July 1318 (OT 1–4).
 Books II–IV 1317–18 (transcription of the lectures; OT 5–7).
  (OT 8).
  (before 1327) (OT 9).
  (1323–24. OT 10).
  (1323–24, OT 10).

Political writings
  (1332–1334).
  (1334).
  (before 1335).
  [XXII] (1335).
  [XII] (1337–38).
  (1340–41).
  (1341–42).
  (1341–42).
  [also known as ] (1346–47).

Doubtful writings
  (Lesser Treatise on logic) (1340–1347?, OP 7).
  (Primer of logic) (1340–1347?, OP 7).

Spurious writings
  (OP 7).
  (OP 7).
  (OP 7).
  (OP 7).

Translations

Philosophical works
Philosophical Writings, tr. P. Boehner, rev. S. Brown (Indianapolis, Indiana, 1990)
Ockham on Aristotle's Physics: A Translation of Ockham's , translated by Julian Davies (St. Bonaventure, New York: The Franciscan Institute, 1989)
Kluge, Eike-Henner W., "William of Ockham's Commentary on Porphyry: Introduction and English Translation", Franciscan Studies 33, pp. 171–254, and 34, pp. 306–382,  (1973–74)
Predestination, God's Foreknowledge, and Future Contingents, translated by Marilyn McCord Adams and Norman Kretzmann (New York: Appleton-Century-Crofts, 1969) [translation of ]
Quodlibetal Questions, translated by Alfred J. Freddoso and Francis E. Kelley, 2 vols (New Haven; London: Yale University Press, 1991) (translation of )
 Paul Spade, Five Texts on the Mediaeval Problem of Universals: Porphyry, Boethius, Abelard, Duns Scotus, Ockham (Indianapolis, Indiana: Hackett, 1994) [Five questions on Universals from His  d. 2 qq. 4–8]

Theological works
The  of William of Ockham, translated by T. Bruce Birch (Burlington, Iowa: Lutheran Literary Board, 1930) [translation of Treatise on Quantity and On the Body of Christ]

Political works
, translated Cary J. Nederman, in Political thought in early fourteenth-century England: treatises by Walter of Milemete, William of Pagula, and William of Ockham (Tempe, Arizona: Arizona Center for Medieval and Renaissance Studies, 2002)
A translation of William of Ockham's Work of Ninety Days, translated by John Kilcullen and John Scott (Lewiston, New York: E. Mellen Press, 2001) [translation of ]
On the Power of Emperors and Popes, translated by Annabel S. Brett (Bristol, 1998)
Rega Wood, Ockham on the Virtues (West Lafayette, Indiana: Purdue University Press, 1997) [includes translation of On the Connection of the Virtues]
A Letter to the Friars Minor, and Other Writings, translated by John Kilcullen (Cambridge: Cambridge University Press, 1995) [includes translation of ]
A Short Discourse on the Tyrannical Government, translated by John Kilcullen (Cambridge: Cambridge University Press, 1992) [translation of ]
 William of Ockham, [Question One of] Eight Questions on the Power of the Pope, translated by Jonathan Robinson

In fiction
William of Occam served as an inspiration for the creation of William of Baskerville, the main character of Umberto Eco's novel The Name of the Rose, and is the main character of La abadía del crimen (The Abbey of Crime), a video game based upon said novel.

See also
 Gabriel Biel
 Philotheus Boehner
 History of science#Middle Ages
 List of Catholic clergy scientists
 List of scholastic philosophers
 Ernest Addison Moody
 occam (programming language)
 Ockham algebra
 Oxford Franciscan school
 Rule according to higher law
 Terminism

Notes

References

Further reading

External links

 Mediaeval Logic and Philosophy, maintained by Paul Vincent Spade
 William of Ockham at the Internet Encyclopedia of Philosophy
 William of Ockham biography at University of St Andrews, Scotland
 Dialogus, text translation and studies at British Academy, UK
 The Nominalist Ontology of William of Ockham, with an annotated bibliography
Richard Utz and Terry Barakat, "Medieval Nominalism and the Literary Questions: Selected Studies." Perspicuitas 
 The Myth of Occam's Razor by William M. Thorburn (1918)
 BBC Radio 4 'In Our Time' programme on Ockham Download and listen
 
 
 

1287 births
1347 deaths
14th-century English writers
14th century in science
14th-century Latin writers
14th-century English mathematicians
14th-century philosophers
Alumni of the University of Oxford
Catholic clergy scientists
Empiricists
English philosophers
English Franciscans
English logicians
English Christian theologians
Latin commentators on Aristotle
Occamism
People excommunicated by the Catholic Church
People from the Borough of Guildford
Philosophers of language
Catholic philosophers
Scholastic philosophers
Scholasticism
Anglican saints